MI15, the British Military Intelligence Section 15 (now defunct), was a department of the British Directorate of Military Intelligence, part of  the War Office. It was set up in 1942 to handle aerial photography (compare with MI4). In 1943 this function was transferred to the air ministry and MI15 became responsible for the coordination of intelligence about enemy anti-aircraft facilities.

History

References

Defunct United Kingdom intelligence agencies
1942 establishments in the United Kingdom
Military communications of the United Kingdom
War Office in World War II
British intelligence services of World War II